Farah Jacques (born February 8, 1990 in Montreal, Quebec) is a Canadian track and field athlete competing in the sprint events, predominantly the 200m event.

In July 2016, she was officially named to Canada's Olympic team as part of the 4x100 meters relay team.

References

1990 births
Living people
Athletes from Montreal
Canadian female sprinters
Athletes (track and field) at the 2016 Summer Olympics
Olympic track and field athletes of Canada
Canadian sportspeople of Haitian descent
Haitian Quebecers
Black Canadian track and field athletes
Black Canadian sportswomen
Olympic female sprinters